Luis Fernando De León is a Panamanian evolutionary biologist. He is an assistant professor of biology and evolutionary biology at the University of Massachusetts Boston, research associate at the Instituto de Investigaciones Científicas y Servicios de Alta Tecnología de Panamá (INDICASAT), and level I member of the Sistema Nacional de Investigadores (SNI) in Panama.

Education 
Luis completed a B.Sc. in Biology at University of Panama in 2002. He earned a Ph.D. from McGill University in 2011.

Research 
Luis Fernando De León has published over 40 peer-reviewed scientific papers which together have received over 700 citations. His research focuses on adaptive divergence and speciation, human impacts on evolution,
eco-evolutionary dynamics. His lab works primarily on Darwin's finches and weakly-electric fishes in the order Gymnotiformes. He was invited to be the Saul Speaker at Middlebury College in 2020.

References

External links
 Lab Website
 Google Scholar Page

21st-century American biologists
University of Panama alumni
Living people
Evolutionary biologists
Panamanian scientists
Year of birth missing (living people)